Uganda Conservation Foundation (UCF) is a UK-registered charity and not-for-profit organisation in Uganda that works with Uganda Wildlife Authority (UWA) and other partners, both local and international to protect Uganda's national parks, protected areas, and conservancies. Uganda Wildlife Authority, a semi-autonomous government agency works with independent organisations to support their mandate of conserving, managing and regulating Uganda's wildlife. UCF was founded in 2001 by Michael Keigwin MBE who was responsible for running the Elephants, Crops and People project in Queen Elizabeth National Park. UCF has since worked with UWA in Murchison Falls National Park, Kidepo Valley National Park, Ziwa Rhino Sanctuary and Queen Elizabeth National Park.

Recovery of Murchison Falls Programme 
In 2012, UCF supported UWA in their bid to put a stop to increasingly common incidences of poaching. Through this project they managed to develop the appropriate infrastructure to combat poaching by training and equipping rangers, building a state of the art communications system and by providing vehicles.

They also established and managed an educational program within the communities on the fringes of the park. Through this program 80 young people have been able to go through vocational training.

Also of particular note is the recently completed Law Enforcement and Operations Center in Murchison Falls National Park which features an advanced anti-poaching mechanism, from satellite linked surveillance screens to temporary prison cells and a police station. One hundred youths from the park-adjacent communities were employed by the contractor and many of them are now training to join UWA as rangers.

Since its inception, the recovery of Murchison falls project has constructed 12 key Ranger posts in strategic locations around the park and implemented a new surveillance system. This has been fundamental in fighting poaching and helping animal numbers to increase. Rothschild's giraffe numbers have increased from 400 to 2000 whilst African bush elephant numbers have increased to around 3000.

COVID-19 response 
The COVID-19 pandemic saw tourism grind to a halt, and the 95% drop in funding had devastating effects on the national park's operations. The loss of income left them grappling to keep up with the day-to-day costs associated with protecting and rescuing wildlife.

The Wildlife Ranger Challenge was established in 2020 to support rangers across Africa who had been negatively impacted by COVID-19. The Uganda arm of the event, which consisted of ranger teams running a half marathon with 22 kg on their back, took place in Queen Elizabeth national park in both 2020 & 2021 and was managed by UCF.

High resolution aerial camera survey in Queen Elizabeth National Park 
A paper published in February 2023 with the results of the 2018 Queen Elizabeth National Park aerial survey undertaken by UCF and UWA puts the African bush elephant population in the park at an estimated 4,711, which is 62% higher than the previous observer-based estimate of 2,900 in the 2014 Great Elephant Census, and the highest since counts began in the 1960s.

UWA needed precise wildlife population estimates to guide conservation actions, but population estimates derived from aerial observers showed great variability and therefore trends were hard to discern. This survey replaced Rear Seat Observers RSOs with Oblique Camera Count imaging systems orientated at 40 degrees and captured 43,000 images for enumeration of 13 species. The photos were interpreted by a team of four Ugandan interpreters, originally trained in similar exercises in Uganda and Kenya. 

The highest densities of elephant distribution were in the thicket areas along Kazinga Channel, and there was a very low carcass ratio of only 1.4%, compared to 3.1% in the Great Elephant Census 2014 count. Buffalo are widely distributed through out the national park, with the largest concentrations in open grasslands and around waterholes in Ishasha, Kyambura and Kasenyi Plains.

The survey was led by Dr Richard Lamprey and was conducted with funding from UWA and some international conservation agencies including Save the Elephants, International Elephant Foundation, Global Conservation and Vulcan Inc.

References 

Charities based in the United Kingdom
Nature conservation organisations based in the United Kingdom
Nature conservation in Uganda
Non-profit organisations based in Uganda